Heart Strings (originally titled Heart & Soul - 13 Rock Classics) is the thirteenth studio album by Welsh singer Bonnie Tyler. It was first released in Scandinavia under the title Heart & Soul on 28 October 2002 by CMC, a Danish record label. The album received a wider European release on 18 March 2003. The album features thirteen cover songs recorded with the City of Prague Philharmonic Orchestra and Tyler's band.

Background 
EMI proposed a one-off deal to record an album of cover songs with the City of Prague Philharmonic Orchestra and Tyler's live band, which included John Young, Alan Darby, Matt Prior, Thomas Lang, John Tonks and Ed Poole. Tyler picked out thirteen tracks to record, most of which were originally performed by male artists. Tyler thought about recording songs by some of her favourite female artists, including Janis Joplin and Tina Turner, but felt that she would not be able to improve on their interpretations.

The album booklet includes a credit to Arthur Fufkin, a reference to the fictional character Artie Fufkin from the 1984 mockumentary This Is Spinal Tap.

Recording 
The album was recorded between June and September 2002. Tyler began by recording guide vocals accompanied by an acoustic guitar. The orchestra was recorded over one week at the Barrandov Studios and Smecky Music Studios in Prague, Czech Republic. Tyler then returned to the UK to record additional vocals with her band at Ridge Farm, the Engine Room, Startrack Studios and Darby Studios. Part-way through the recording process, the original producer left the project and Tyler's manager David Aspden and guitarist Matt Prior then stepped in.

Music 
Heart Strings is an album of covers combining orchestral and rock instruments. The album also features gospel and blues influences on tracks like "Lean on Me" and "Need Your Love So Bad".

Release and promotion 
A promotional photo and video shoot was taken at the Thingbæk Kalkminer, an old limestone mine turned museum near Skørping, Denmark. Tyler embarked on a 9-date tour of Germany to promote the album between April and May 2003. In June 2003, Tyler performed a headline set at Donauinselfest in Vienna, Austria. Tyler promoted the album on various European TV networks including ARD, ZDF, Sat.1, RTL, TF1 and TV4.

"Amazed" was released as the album's only single in 2002. "Against All Odds (Take a Look at Me Now)" and "Learning to Fly" were released as promotional singles in 2002 and 2003 respectively.

The album was first released in Scandinavia under the title Heart and Soul - 13 Rock Classics on 28 October 2002 by the Danish label CMC. The album received a wider release under the title Heart Strings on 18 March 2003.

Track listing

Charts

Personnel 
 Bonnie Tyler – vocals, violin
 David Aspden – keyboards 
 Matt Prior – keyboards, guitars, acoustic guitar
 Alan Darby – guitars, rhythm guitar, acoustic guitar, slide guitar, dobro, arrangements (4)
 Ed Poole – electric bass, fretless bass
 Paul Turner – electric bass
 Thomas Lang – drums 
 John Tonks – drums
 Thomas Dyani – percussion
 James McNally – bodhrán, low whistle
 City of Prague Philharmonic Orchestra – orchestra
 Nick Ingman – arrangements (1, 3, 7, 8, 9)
 Karl Jenkins – arrangements (2, 5, 6, 12, 13), conductor, score (11)
 John Young – arrangements (4, 11)
 Gerald McBurney – arrangements (10)
 Sam Brown – backing vocals 
 Margot Buchanan – backing vocals 
 Rita Campbell – backing vocals 
 Claudia Fontaine – backing vocals 
 Aitch McRobbie – backing vocals

Production 
 David Aspden – producer, engineer 
 Matt Prior – producer, engineer, editing
 Helen Atkinson – engineer 
 Alan Darby – engineer 
 Jan Holzner – engineer 
 Richard "Dread" Mann – engineer 
 Morten Munch – engineer, editing
 Michael Wolff – engineer
 Philip Allen – assistant engineer 
 Nick Davis – mixing
 Søren Bundgaard – editing
 Dave Meegan – editing
 Tim Young – mastering
 Nils Krogh – photography
 Stefan Klein – artwork

References 

2003 albums
Bonnie Tyler albums
Covers albums
City of Prague Philharmonic Orchestra albums